The 2018 World Pool Masters, also known as World Pool Masters XXV, was a nine-ball pool tournament that took place in Gibraltar between 2–4 March 2018. It was the 25th edition of the invitational tournament organised by Matchroom Sport.

Dutchman Niels Feijen defeated Shane Van Boening of the United States in the final to win the title for the second time in his career.

Tournament prize money

Players
16 players took part in the tournament, including 12 former champions. Two other former champions – Tony Drago and Francisco Bustamante – had been scheduled to take part, but withdrew before the start of the competition and were replaced by Karl Boyes and Joshua Filler. Spain's David Alcaide defended the title he won in 2017, but was defeated in the first round by Karl Boyes.

Tournament

Seeds
China's Wu Jiaqing withdrew prior to the start of the competition, and was replaced in the draw by England's Chris Melling.

Draw
The draw for the tournament was made on 30 January.

References

External links
 Official website

2018
World Pool Masters
World Pool Masters
World Pool Masters
World Pool Masters